Leslie Gilbert Pine (22 December 1907 – 15 May 1987) was a British writer, lecturer, and researcher in the areas of genealogy, nobility, history, heraldry and animal welfare.

Early life and education
Pine was born at Bristol, the son of Henry Moorshead Pine, a tea merchant, and Lilian Grace, daughter of James Phillips Beswetherick, of Glastonbury.  He was educated at Tellisford House School, Bristol, the South West London College at Barnes, and at the University of London, where he took a BA.

Career
From 1935 to 1940, Pine was an assistant editor at Burke's Peerage Ltd. During World War II he was an officer in the Royal Air Force intelligence branch, serving in North Africa, Italy, Greece, and India; he retired with the rank of Squadron Leader. After the war and until 1960, he was Burke's executive director. Pine edited Burke's Peerage, 1949–1959; Burke's Landed Gentry (of Great Britain), 1952; Burke's Landed Gentry (of Ireland), 1958; and, Burke's Distinguished Families of America, 1939, 1947.  He also edited The International Year Book and Statesmen's Who's Who, 1953–1960; Author's and Writer's Who's Who, 1948, 1960; Who's Who in Music, 1949; and, Who's Who in the Free Churches, 1951. He was a consultant for Burke's from 1984.

He became a Barrister-at-Law, Inner Temple, in 1953. Pine was a member of the International Institute of Genealogy and Heraldry, Fellow of the Society of Antiquaries of Scotland, a Fellow of the Ancient Monuments Society, a Life Fellow of the Institute of Journalists, a Freeman of the City of London, and a Liveryman of the Glaziers' Company.  In 1959 he was the unsuccessful Conservative candidate for Bristol Central.

Pine was managing editor of a British hunting magazine, Shooting Times, from 1960 to 1964. He later authored an important book highly critical of sport hunting, After Their Blood, in which he wrote: "It is our duty as men and women of God's redeemed creation to try not to increase the suffering of the world, but to lessen it. To get rid of bloodsports will be a great step toward this end."

Personal life
In 1948 Pine married Grace Violet (20 August 1914 – 5 November 2019), daughter of Albert Griffin and Margaret Emily (née Stowers), of Chelmsford. Their only child, Richard Pine, was born in London on 21 August 1949. Pine died in Bury St Edmunds, Suffolk in 1987.

Works
His books are:

 "The Stuarts of Traquair" (1940)
 The Middle Sea: A Short History of the Mediterranean (1950/1973)
 "The Golden Book of the Coronation" (1953)
 Trace Your Ancestors (1953)
 "The House of Wavell" (1953)
 They Came with the Conqueror: A Study of the Modern Descendants of the Normans (1954)
 Tales of the British aristocracy (1956)
 Heraldry and Genealogy: Teach Yourself (1957/1970)
 "The House of Constantine" (1957)
 The Twilight of Monarchy (1958)
 Orders of Chivalry and Decorations of Honour of the World (1960)
 Ramshackledom, A Critical Appraisal of the Establishment (1962)
 Heraldry, Ancestry And Titles: Questions And Answers (1965)
 The Story of Surnames (1965)
 The Story of Heraldry (1952, revised 1966)
 After Their Blood : a Survey of Blood Sports in Britain (1966)
 Tradition and Custom in Modern Britain (1967)
 Genealogist's Encyclopedia (1969)
 Story of Titles  (1969)
 Princes of Wales (1970)
 International Heraldry (1970)
 The Highland Clans (1972)
 The History of Hunting (1973)
 Sons of the Conqueror: Descendant of the Norman Dynasty (1973)
 The New Extinct Peerage, 1884–1971: Containing Extinct, Abeyant, Dormant & Suspended Peerages with Genealogies and Arms (1973)
 American Origins (1980)
 A Dictionary of Mottoes (1983)
 A Dictionary of Nicknames (1984)

Pine is also the primary contributor to the article "Genealogy" in the Encyclopædia Britannica.

References

England & Wales, Death Index: 1984–2004 Record, Volume 10, Page 2278, from Ancestry.com
The Times, Deaths, 1982–1988 Record, from Ancestry.com
Contemporary Authors. A bio-bibliographical guide to current writers in fiction, general nonfiction, poetry, journalism, drama, motion pictures, television, and other fields. Volume 122. Detroit: Gale Research, 1988.
The Times, 21 May 1987
L.G. Pine, The Story of Heraldry  (Rutland, Vt: Chas. E. Tuttle, 1966).

1907 births
1987 deaths
British heraldists
English genealogists
Information and reference writers
Royal Air Force personnel of World War II
Royal Air Force officers
Hunting and shooting in the United Kingdom
Fellows of the Society of Antiquaries of London
British sportswriters
Members of the Inner Temple
20th-century English historians
20th-century British lawyers
Writers from Bristol
Military personnel from Bristol